Szczecin Voivodeship Office is a historic administrative building opened in 1911, located at the Chrobry Embankment in city of Szczecin, Poland.

History 

The main designer was Berlin architect Paul Kieschke. After his death in 1905, Paul Lehmgrübner continued the project and supervised the construction. Work began in 1906 on the land of a size of 12860 m², purchased for 392 000 marks. Due to the terrain shape and the residues of Fort Leopold located here before, appropriate construction work has been preceded by large scale earth works which included among others moat bridge, replacement of peat substrate, drainage area, etc. The building was built on the powerful, concrete foundations in places reaching 11 m below street level. The result of nearly six years of ongoing construction work was monumental complex of three buildings connected by a common, richly decorated facade. Style refers to the structure of German historicism, emphasizing in particular parts of the northern Renaissance. The complex has two inner courtyards and two towers, one of which, 72 m in height, surmounted by a figure of Sailor [picture]. Many rooms in the building has a representative character, and retains the original decoration (including: the main hall, stairway, conference).

The building was completed in 1911. Its central part was taken by the Government Presidium (Regierungspräsidium) of the Stettin Region. The southern part was the regional president's official home. In the northern part of the office complex, offshore institutions such as Maritime Authority, Lloyd's Agency, Police and Port Authority of Hydraulic Engineering were located.

The investment cost amounted to 3.53327 million marks. The total area of buildings is 19451 m².

The building was not damaged during the bombings of Szczecin during World War II.

The present building of the Regional Office was the first seat of Polish municipalities with Piotr Zaremba in the lead, who on April 30, 1945 ordered to raise the Poland flag on the building.

In 1985, the building of the Regional Office has been entered in the register of monuments.

In 2011, on its 100 year anniversary, the building was made available to the public, including tourist routes covering both underground (with the uncharted, flooded by water tunnel [inline] running in the direction of the Oder river) and towers (here with in turn a collection of gargoyle, gathered by Germans in unknown purpose can be admired [inline]).

Gallery

Footnotes

Buildings and structures in Szczecin
Office buildings completed in 1911
West Pomeranian Voivodeship
Old Town, Szczecin